Mark Quashie (born 24 January 1967), better known as The Mad Stuntman, is a Trinidadian-born American electronic dance artist and vocalist. Quashie's moniker was inspired by the 1980s action/adventure television program The Fall Guy which starred actor Lee Majors as a Hollywood stuntman, moonlighting as a bounty hunter.  Making his home in Brooklyn, New York, The Mad Stuntman was introduced to producer/DJ Erick Morillo by Panamanian reggae artist El General, who is dubbed the "Father of Reggaeton". Morillo was looking for an act to be featured on his upcoming single "Go On Move" and to ultimately join him on tour as a group.
"Go On Move" was originally intended to be an underground dub track, primarily instrumentals with minimal vocal showcasing on the hook, however the distinct energetic rough reggae style vocals of The Mad Stuntman propelled the 1992 single into mainstream success, and prompted its modification for commercial release.

"Go On Move" peaked at number 6 on the U.S. dance charts, which began Reel 2 Real featuring The Mad Stuntman's ascent into popular mainstream music. The Latin-reggae duo's sophomore 1993 single "I Like to Move It" became the group's most commercially successful and recognizable song, topping both American and European charts. The single quickly achieved number one hit status, first peaking in France and The Netherlands, before becoming a chart-topping hit throughout Europe. In 1994, the song peaked at number 89 on the U.S. Billboard Hot 100 chart. Reel 2 Real's "Move It Move It" featuring The Mad Stuntman continued to gain global popularity, hitting number 5 on the UK Singles Chart and reaching number eight on the U.S. Hot Dance chart. The Mad Stuntman proved to be one of Erick Morillo's most valuable artists, appearing on four of Reel 2 Real's top ten dance hits.

In 2005, DreamWorks Studios used the song in its first installment of the Madagascar franchise. British comedian Sacha Baron Cohen was cast to voice the character of King Julien XIII and perform his rendition of the song. Madagascar's use of "I Like to Move it" in the film, made the song a popular anthem for millions of viewers worldwide. Producer will.i.am duplicated The Mad Stuntman's style for his character Moto Moto in Madagascar 2, while acclaimed comedian/actor Chris Rock gave a colorful mash-up performance of the song, "Afro Circus/I Like to Move It" as Marty The Zebra in Madagascar 3: Europe's Most Wanted.

"I Like to Move It" media demand
"I Like to Move It" became an instant media sensation, reaching a large demand for use in various sports promotions, film projects and commercial advertisements. In 2001, Columbia Pictures licensed the song as a soundtrack cut for its comedy film Saving Silverman. The song was also featured in Perry Andelin Blake's 2002 film The Master of Disguise starring Dana Carvey. Still noticeably popular among wide audiences, major film studio DreamWorks featured the song in its 2005 animated film Madagascar. "I Like To Move It" resonated with a broad global audience, which led to the studios decision to make it the permanent theme song for the Madagascar film franchise.

Use in the Madagascar films
The song is used in DreamWorks Animation's Madagascar film franchise serving as its theme song, where different versions of the song are featured prominently in the films, their soundtracks, and associated marketing campaigns. In the first film, Madagascar, "I Like to Move It" is performed by British comedian Sacha Baron Cohen, who voices the character of King Julien XIII in the films. In the 2008 sequel Madagascar: Escape 2 Africa, a different version is performed by American hip-hop artist will.i.am, who plays the character of Moto Moto (although the Sacha Baron Cohen version can be heard in the film's DVD main menu as well as theatrical trailers). Both versions include (different) lyrics referencing the characters and plot of the two films. Snippets of the song are performed by other characters in the films as well. The song appears again in the 2012 sequel Madagascar 3: Europe's Most Wanted as a mash-up with "Afro Circus", performed by Cohen (Danny Jacobs, the TV singing voice of King Julien, in the soundtrack) with Chris Rock (who plays the character of Marty). Afro Circus/I Like to Move It can be briefly heard in Penguins of Madagascar. (The song does not appear in the TV series The Penguins of Madagascar; a scene in the title sequence replaces the song with a sound-alike.) The Reel 2 Real version is heard in the first episode of All Hail King Julien.

Featured commercial advertisements
There have been various iterations of the song which has been encapsulated in a constant rotation among numerous major commercial advertisers. In 2001, candy manufacturer Chewits used the song in its television ad titled "I Like To Chew It, Chew it". The Australian arm of General Motors Holden Barina licensed the song for its 2006 "Bad Skills" television ad. British company, SSL International licensed the song for use in its 2008 Durex condom ads, cleverly named "I Like To Do It. Do It". The hit single was part of McDonald's, India "Move It To Madagascar" TV campaign, by global advertising company, Leo Burnett. Car manufacturer Jeep used the song for its holiday themed Jeep Year-End Sell-A-Thon ad. Australian Health Insurance company NIB Health Funds licensed the song for its 2013 "Move It To NIB" ad. Japanese car manufacturer Toyota licensed the song for its 2014 Yaris ad "Musical City". Canadian telecom giant Telus licensed the song for its 2014 television spot "Don't Miss Out". Danish food Manufacturer Rynkeby's dancing orangutan became an Internet hit, as it danced to "I Like To Move It", in the company's "Monkey Dance" ad. The ad reached over a million views in a matter of days.

Video games
"I Like to Move It" has been featured in many video games. In 2001, Toshiba/EMI added the song to its Dancemania compilation album series, resulting in its licensing for Just Dance, Just Dance 3. This gave rise to the song being featured in DDRMAX: Dance Dance Revolution as a result of a major licensing deal between Konami and Toshiba/EMI. Iranian-Danish trance producer DJ Aligator remixed the song for use in Dancemania EX2.  American video game development company Harmonix also used the song in its Guitar Hero series spinoff, DJ Hero. Japanese gaming company Nintendo licensed "I Like to Move It" as the theme song for its video game Miami Nights: Singles in the City. The song emerged again in Mario Striker's Charged as Koopa Troopa's theme song.

Charts and certifications

Weekly charts

Year-end charts

Certifications

Discography

Albums
 1994 Move It!
 1995 Reel 2 Remixed
 1996 Are You Ready for Some More?

Singles

Soundtrack appearances

References

External links 

 
 Mark Quashie at NYTimes.com's Movies & TV
 The Mad Stuntman page at Facebook

20th-century Trinidad and Tobago male singers
20th-century Trinidad and Tobago singers
1967 births
Living people
Ragga musicians
Reggae fusion artists
Trinidad and Tobago emigrants to the United States